Caroline Chepkorir Kwambai (born 9 September 1975) is a Kenyan former long-distance runner who competed in road running competitions. Her greatest international honour was a team gold at the 2001 IAAF World Half Marathon Championships, where she finished twelfth. She also won a team gold as a junior athlete at the 1990 IAAF World Cross Country Championships. She holds a marathon personal best of 2:28:47 hours, set during her runner-up finish at the 2003 Amsterdam Marathon.

Kwambai was a frequent competitor in European road races and won several high profile half marathons, including: the Paris Half Marathon, Prague Half Marathon, Great Scottish Run and Zwolle Half Marathon. She was also the 2003 winner of the BIG 25 Berlin and Fifth Third River Bank Run races over 25 kilometres. She competed in a dozen marathons in her career. She was in the top three at the Prague International Marathon in 2006 and 2008. In 2007, she was runner-up at the Turin Marathon and third at the Singapore Marathon. Her sole marathon win was at the lower level Kassel Marathon in Germany in 2012.

International competitions

Circuit wins
Fifth Third River Bank Run: 2008
BIG 25 Berlin: 2003
La Lagarina Half Marathon: 2010
Paris Half Marathon: 2007
Prague Half Marathon: 2006
Cordoba Half Marathon: 2005
Great Scottish Run: 2003
Zwolle Half Marathon: 2002
Gironingen Half Marathon: 2002
Wurzburger Residenzlauf: 2003
Zwitserloot Dak Run: 2002

Personal bests
1500 metres – 4:22.08 min (1990)
5000 metres – 15:56.30 min (2003)
10K run – 31:28 min (2001)
Half marathon – 69:45 min (2001)
Marathon – 2:28:47 (2003)

References

External links

Living people
1975 births
Kenyan female long-distance runners
Kenyan female marathon runners